Kanyakumari is a 1974 Indian Malayalam-language film written by M. T. Vasudevan Nair and directed by K. S. Sethumadhavan. It stars Kamal Haasan in the lead role of the protagonist and Rita Bhaduri in the female lead. It was the debut film of Jagathy Sreekumar The film deals with the a man who makes sculptures where he meets a girl who sells bangles and pearls on the sea shore and falls in love with him.

This is the first adult role of Haasan in Malayalam language films after his appearance as a child artist in Kannum Karalum. He also received his first Filmfare award for this movie. This movie was also Rita Bhaduri's debut in cinema.

Plot 
Sankaran a sculptor, who comes to Kanyakumari to work under a contractor and a group of tourists who reach the place. Sankaran falls in love with a poor vendor of necklaces made of sea shells Parvathi. An orphan Parvathi is brought up by Kannamma her maternal grandmother. Veerappan the foster son of Kannamma, keeps tormenting Parvathi, destroying the necklaces she makes. Sankaran decides to marry Parvathi once his work is complete. He hopes to leave Kanyakumari with Parvathi. In the meanwhile, Veerappan attempts to sell Parvathi to Frederick, a depraved sportsman camping at the guest house on the beach. Parvathi manages to escape this attempt.

Jayan son of a rich businessman, comes to Kanyakumari seeking solace. He happens to meet his lover Rajani, now wife of Somasundaram, a wealthy businessman. It was this broken love affair that turned Jayan into a wreck. Rajani was forced to marry the old businessman man to save her family from a financial crisis.

The immoral relationship between Frederick and the young wife of a North Indian businessman forms the sub-plot of the film. Jayan who happens to see this is threatened by Frederick and is warned not to interfere in his personal matters. Jayan makes friends with Swami, an itinerant sanyasi. Both of them take pity on Parvathi and they try to save her Veerappan and Frederick.

Events take a cruel turn. One night, Frederick accosts Parvathi while she was alone on the beach and attempts to rapes her. Sankaran who hears her screams rushes to the spot. He hits Frederick with his sculptor’s hammer killing him at once. Sankaran taken away by the police and Parvathi staring at him with eyes full of tears.

Cast 

 Kamal Haasan as Sankaran
 Rita Bhaduri as Parvathi
 Prem Nawas as Jayan
 Sankaradi as North Indian businessman
 Murali das as Frederick
 Veeran as Somasundaram
 Manimala as Rajani
 Pala Thankam as Kannamma
 N. Govindan Kutty as Veerappan
 Alummoodan as Bhaskaran
 Jagathy Sreekumar as Tourist
 Mallika Sukumaran as Tourist
 K. G. Menon as Swami
 O. Ramadas
 M. O. Devasia
 Ashok Kumar
 Appachan
 Maala
 Madhumathi
 Rajani
 Vijayalakshmi
 Meena Kumari
 Baby Radhika
 Sindhu
 Sherly

Production 
Kanyakumari was written by M. T. Vasudevan Nair, directed by K. S. Sethumadhavan, and produced by K. S. R. Moorthy under Chithranjali Films. Cinematography was handled by P. L. Roy. The entire film was shot at Kanyakumari city and surroundings. This movie was also Rita Bhaduri's debut in cinema.

Soundtrack 
The music was composed by M. B. Sreenivasan and the lyrics were written by Vayalar Ramavarma and M. B. Sreenivasan.

Release and reception 
Kanyakumari was released on 26 July 1974. The film went on to become a box office hit. In 2014, B. Vijayakumar of The Hindu wrote, "Kamal Haasan and Rita Bhaduri impressed with their natural style of acting. Alummoodan, as a waiter in the guest house, created moments of laughter."

Awards 
Filmfare Awards South
Kamal haasan won Filmfare Award for Best Actor – Malayalam.

References

External links 
 

1970s Malayalam-language films
1974 films
Films directed by K. S. Sethumadhavan
Films scored by M. B. Sreenivasan
Films with screenplays by M. T. Vasudevan Nair